Look It Up may refer to:

 Look It Up (album) or the title song, by Jasmine Rae, 2008
 "Look It Up" (song), by Ashton Shepherd, 2011